Catarina Pollini (born 16 March 1966) is a retired Italian basketball player. She competed in the women's tournament at the 1992 Summer Olympics and the 1996 Summer Olympics.

References

1966 births
Living people
Italian women's basketball players
Olympic basketball players of Italy
Basketball players at the 1992 Summer Olympics
Basketball players at the 1996 Summer Olympics
Houston Comets players
Italian expatriate basketball people in Spain
Italian expatriate basketball people in the United States
Sportspeople from Vicenza
Texas Longhorns women's basketball players
Centers (basketball)
Power forwards (basketball)